Kevin Seefried (born ) is an American drywall mechanic and January 6 United States Capitol attacker who threatened police officer Eugene Goodman. In February 2023, he was sentenced to three years in prison for his role in the attack.

Images of Seefried became some of the most recognizable image of the attack.

Career 
Seefried is a drywall mechanic.

United States Capitol attack 
During the a January 6 United States Capitol attacker, Seefried was one of the first few attackers to enter the Capitol building and he remained inside it for 25 minutes, according to prosecutors. Seefried brandished a confederate flag on a flag pole and made threatening motions towards black police officer Eugene Goodman. Images of Seefried became some of the most recognizable image of the attack.

Seefried was charged with obstructing an official proceeding, disorderly conduct in a Capitol building and entering and remaining in a restricted area. Seefried's adult son Hunter Seefied also attended the attack and was sentenced in October 2022 to two years in prison after being found guilty of obstruction. 

In June 2022, the District Court for the District of Columbia judge Trevor McFadden found Seefried guilty on all five charges. On February 9, 2023, Seefried was sentenced to three years in prison.

Personal life 
Seefried is from Delaware and was aged 53 in February 2023.

See also 

 Criminal proceedings in the January 6 United States Capitol attack

References 

Living people
American firefighters
Convicted participants in the January 6 United States Capitol attack
American male criminals

Criminals from Delaware
Year of birth missing (living people)